Visitors to Colombia must obtain a visa from one of the Colombian diplomatic missions unless they come from one of the visa-exempt countries.

Visa policy map

Visa policy
Holders of passports of the following jurisdictions do not require visa to enter Colombia for a maximum stay of 90 days (unless otherwise noted):

ID - May also enter using an ID card.
1 - The maximum stay is granted within one year.

Citizens of  who are residents of North Caribbean Coast Autonomous Region and South Caribbean Coast Autonomous Region may enter Colombia without a visa.

Colombia also requires citizens of Cuba and holders of passports issued by Palestine to apply for a transit visa before transiting through the country.
Visitors over the age of 6 arriving at San Andrés and Leticia must purchase tourist cards on arrival at a cost of 105,000 pesos and 30,000 pesos.
Holders of diplomatic or official/service passports of China, Egypt, India, Iran, Lebanon, Mongolia, Morocco, Thailand, Ukraine and Vietnam and holders of official passports of Cuba do not require a visa.
Visa-free agreement for holders of diplomatic and service passports was signed with Kazakhstan in December 2019, and it is yet to be ratified.
Visa-free agreement for holders of diplomatic and service passports was signed with Oman in January 2022, and it is yet to be ratified.

Substitute visa

 
The visa exemption also applies to Green Card holders, but does not apply to holders of C1 visas issued by the U.S. Holders of U.S. or Schengen visas must ensure their visa is valid for at least 180 days from their arrival date.

eVisa
Visitors who require a visa for Colombia may apply online.

Visitor statistics
Most visitors arriving to Colombia were from the following countries of nationality:

See also

Visa requirements for Colombian citizens

References

External links
KOLUMBIANISCHE BOTSCHAFT IN DEUTSCHLAND VER TAFIFAS CONSULARES
Comparison of Types of Colombian Visas VER TIPOS DE VISAS

Colombia